Mother Teresa: In the Name of God's Poor is a 1997 made-for-television biographical film directed by Kevin Connor and starring Geraldine Chaplin as Mother Teresa. Mother Teresa herself had approved the script but withdrew her imprimatur shortly before her death. It was broadcast on what was then known as The Family Channel on 5 October 1997.

Plot 

In mid-1940s Calcutta, Mother Teresa teaches geography at her convent. One day, she and one of the other sisters go outside the convent to find food for their girls, only to get caught up in a riot. Though they manage to make it back to the convent, Mother Teresa is shocked by the sight of the massive number of people starving in the streets. Haunted by the images of the hungry people, Mother Teresa decides to leave the convent to devote her life to caring for the poorest of the poor.

Soon after her arrival in the slums, Mother Teresa teaches the children to read and write, but she faces opposition from the adults in the slum who mistrust her because of the colour of her skin. As Mother Teresa continues her crusade to help the poor, some of her former students from the convent come to her with the desire to become nuns and help her on her mission.

The films end scene sees Mother Teresa travelling to Oslo, Norway to receive the Nobel Peace Prize.

Cast
Geraldine Chaplin as Mother Teresa
Keene Curtis as Father Van Exem
Helena Carroll as Mother Superior
David Byrd as Archbishop
William Katt as Harry Harper
Ravindra Randeniya as Police chief
Belle Connor as Lorete Pupil
Neil Daluwatte as Deputy Commissioner
Chamitha de Alwis as Charu
Upali De Silva as Angry Worshipper
Nimmi Harasgama as Christina
Sunil Hettiarachchi as Bald Man
Veena Jayakody as Charu Ma
W. Jayasiri as Mr. Goma
Leonie Kotalawela as Hospital Nurse
Hemasiri Liyanage as Manik
Saumya Liyanage as Student Leader
Anna Mathias		
Cornelia Hayes O'Herlihy as Sister Gabriella
Yolanda Peiris as Mabel Goma
Hilarian Perera as Dying Brahmin
Prageeth Sanjeeva as Jyoti
Roger Seneviratne as Student Leader
Alan Shearman
Peter Shepherd as Nobel Official
Sangeetha Weeraratne as Sunitha	
Nilanthi Wijesinghe as Mrs. Goma
Yashoda Wimaladharma as Sister Maria
Ronnie Leitch as Hari

Reception
The film was generally well received by critics. At the time of the broadcast, The Philadelphia Inquirer applauded the film as a triumph for the network, as "probably the most important show it has presented in its 20-year history." Praise was lavished on the "authoritative" Chaplin who "commands the little screen at every turn. Quietly and without histrionics, she convincingly demonstrated Mother Teresa's absolute faith that God guides and God provides, despite opposition from both church and state." The review continued to praise how the film is "skilfully and winningly dramatized..and directed with assurance and passion". William Brailsford of The Washington Times noted that "Miss Chaplin gives a convincing performance as Mother Teresa, imitating her soft voice and her awkward yet charming mannerisms and re-creating that aura of piety that surrounded the "saint of the gutters." This remarkable actress has us in the palm of her hands early on, and she never lets go." Brailsford also praised the realism of the project, "The film's portrayal of the horrors of poverty and disease in India's streets is chillingly realistic. With extreme vividness, some scenes will cause viewers to wince as they become bystanders to the insufferable agonies of the poor and starving."

Caryn James of The New York Times also praised Chaplin "Ms. Chaplin is fine in the role, full of quiet determination and faith". However, James felt that "This faithful telling of her middle years cannot capture her inner life. She seems like one more extremely good woman. Whatever Mother Teresa might have thought of that, it doesn't go far as biography or drama."

The film won the Audience Award at the 1998 Art Film Festival and the writers were nominated for the Humanitas Prize.

Notes
Chaplin drew on her experience as a convent-educated schoolgirl in Switzerland and her once-held desire to become a 
nun.

See also
 Names of God in Christianity
Notable film portrayals of Nobel laureates

References

External links

1997 television films
1997 films
1990s biographical films
American television films
American biographical films
Films directed by Kevin Connor
Films shot in Sri Lanka
Films set in India
Cultural depictions of Mother Teresa
Films about Nobel laureates
Films set in Kolkata
Films about Catholicism
Films about Christianity
Christianity in India
1990s American films